Amauropsis subpallescens is a species of predatory sea snail, a marine gastropod mollusk in the family Naticidae, the moon snails.

References

External links
 Strebel, H. (1908). Die Gastropoden. In: Wissenschaftliche Ergebnisse der Schwedischen Südpolar-Expedition 1901–1903 unter Leitung von Dr. Otto Nordenskjöld, Bd 6, Lief. 1: 111 pp., 6 pls. Stockholm
 Griffiths, H.J.; Linse, K.; Crame, J.A. (2003). SOMBASE - Southern Ocean mollusc database: a tool for biogeographic analysis in diversity and evolution. Organisms Diversity and Evolution. 3: 207-213

Naticidae
Gastropods described in 1908